Time Out of Mind may refer to:

Time immemorial, a legal concept and the origin of the phrase

Film
Time Out of Mind (1947 film), a film starring Phyllis Calvert and Robert Hutton
Time Out of Mind (1968 film), a Verity Films documentary
Time Out of Mind (2014 film), a film starring Richard Gere

Literature
Time Out of Mind, a 1935 book by Rachel Field
Time Out of Mind, a 1956 book by Joan Grant
Time Out of Mind, a 1973 book by John Middleton Murry Jr. (as Richard Cowper) and W.R. Cowper
Time Out of Mind, a 1999 book by Leonard Michaels
Time Out of Mind, a 2006 book of poetry by Laurie Block

Music
"Time Out of Mind", a song by Steely Dan from the 1980 album Gaucho
Time Out of Mind (Bob Dylan album), 1997
Time Out of Mind (Grover Washington Jr. album), 1989
Time Out of Mind, a 2004 album by Troubleman, a musical alias of Mark Pritchard

Television
"Time Out of Mind", an episode of Mannix
"Time Out of Mind", an episode of La Femme Nikita
"Time Out of Mind", an episode of Andromeda
"Time Out of Mind", an episode of Medium
"Time Out of Mind", an episode of Odyssey 5